Anmol Ghadi (English translation: Precious moment(of/in time) is a 1946 Indian drama film directed by Mehboob Khan, starring Surendra, Suraiya and Noor Jehan.

The film was a musical hit and still remembered for its music by Naushad, with hits like "Aawaaz De Kahaan Hai", "Jawaan Hai Mohabbat Haseen Hai Zamana" and "Mere Bachpan Ke Saathi Mujhe Bhool Na Jaana". The film also featured playback singer, Mohammed Rafi's first notable song, "Tera Khilauna Toota Balak", and became the highest-grossing film at the Indian box office in 1946.

The film was an inspiration for the 2001 Telugu movie Manasantha Nuvve. The Telugu movie went to be remade in Hindi as Jeena Sirf Merre Liye (2002), in Kannada as Manasella Neene (2002), in Tamil as Thithikudhe (2003), in Bengali as Moner Majhe Tumi (2003) and in Odia as  Nei Jaa Re Megha Mate(2008).

Plot
Chander and Lata were good childhood friends in Jahanabad, Lata was the daughter of a rich family, whereas Chander was the son of a poor, widowed mother. Lata's parents didn't like Lata being friends with Chander. Lata's family gets transferred to Bombay. At the time of departure, Lata gifts her watch to Chander as a memento.

They grow up. Chander goes to Bombay to search for Lata. Chander's rich friend Prakash opens a musical instruments shop for Chander, where Chander can earn his livelihood by repairing musical instruments. Prakash's mother doesn't like Prakash spending money on Chander. Lata has become a writer, her work is published under the nickname of "Renu" aka "Renuka Devi"; Chander becomes a fan of her work. Basanti is Lata's friend. In one of her novels, Lata writes the story of the Childhood friendship of Chander and Lata. Chander reads it and writes a letter to Renu (Lata) to find out how she knows of this story and if she knows Lata, then she can help him find Lata. Reading that letter, Basanti forces Lata to call Chander to meet, plotting that Basanti will meet Chander as well as Lata. Basanti meets Chander there and falls in love with Chander. Chander was carrying the watch gifted by Lata to him all the time, which he loses when Basanti meets him and Basanti locates it. Seeing the watch, Lata recognizes it and recognizes Chander. Basanti feels hurt and blames Lata that she had known that Basanti was in love with Chander, and even then Lata didn't tell her that Chander is the same guy who Lata herself was in love with. Lata later tells her that she herself was not aware of it.

Lata's parents contact Prakash for marrying Lata. When Chander learns of it, under the lifetime of obligations to Prakash, he sacrifices his love for Lata in favour of Prakash. Chander's mother dies. Prakash marries Lata; Chander walks off into the sunset, followed by Basanti.

Cast
Cast in order of the opening credits
 Noorjehan as Lata/Renuka Devi
 Surendra as Chandrabhan
 Zahur Raja as Prakash
 Suraiya as Basanti
 Leela Misra as Chandrabhan's mother
 Anwari Begum
 Bhudo Advani as Mohan
 Murad as Deputy
 Bibibai
 Amirbanu as Prakash's mother
 N. Kabir as young Chandrabhan
 Noor Mahal as young Lata
 Master Gulam Mohamed
 Wasker
 Agha Mehsher Shirazi
 Nawabkhan

Soundtrack

Music: Naushad; Lyrics: Tanvir Naqvi

References

External links
 

1940s Hindi-language films
1946 films
Indian black-and-white films
1946 drama films
Films directed by Mehboob Khan
1940s Urdu-language films
Hindi films remade in other languages
Urdu films remade in other languages
Indian drama films
Hindi-language drama films
Urdu-language Indian films